Francesco Semeraro (born 1 May 2001) is an Italian professional footballer who plays as a left back for  club Gubbio.

Club career
Born in Fasano, Semerano started his career in A.S. Roma youth sector. On 11 March 2019, he was an unused substitute in Serie A match against Empoli.

In 2020 he signed for Ascoli.

On 5 October 2020, he was loaned to Serie C club Cavese. Semeraro made his professional debut on 22 October 2020 against Juve Stabia.

On 27 July 2021, he joined on loan to Grosseto. 

On 18 July 2022, Semeraro moved to Gubbio on a permanent basis.

International career
Semeraro was a youth international for Italy.

References

External links
 
 

2001 births
Living people
People from Fasano
Footballers from Apulia
Italian footballers
Association football fullbacks
Serie C players
Ascoli Calcio 1898 F.C. players
Cavese 1919 players
U.S. Grosseto 1912 players
A.S. Gubbio 1910 players
Italy youth international footballers
Sportspeople from the Province of Brindisi